Michael Thomas Ozdowski (born September 24, 1955) is a former American football defensive end who played four seasons with the Baltimore Colts of the National Football League (NFL). He was drafted by the Colts in the second round of the 1977 NFL Draft. He played college football at the University of Virginia and attended Parma Senior High School in Parma, Ohio.

Early years
Ozdowski played high school football for the Parma Senior High School Redmen, earning three varsity letters and All-State honors as a middle guard. He was a two-time Plain Dealer Player of the Week honoree and was selected to play in the north–south game. He graduated in 1973. Ozdowski was inducted into the Parma Senior High School Athletic Hall of Fame in 2007.

College career
Ozdowski was a four-year varsity letterman for the Virginia Cavaliers. He earned All-ACC, All-Academic, and Player of the Year honors during his college career. He was named the 1977 University of Virginia Athlete of the Year.

Professional career
Ozdowski was selected by the Baltimore Colts with the 53rd pick in the 1977 NFL Draft. He played in 54 games, starting 29, for the Colts from 1978 to 1981. He spent the 1982 season on injured reserve with a neck injury. Ozdowski became the Colts' new  player representative during the 1982 NFL lockout after Herb Orvis, the prior representative, was cut by the team. Mike was released by the Colts on March 8, 1983.

Personal life
Michael Ozdowski is currently the Head of the Mathematics Department at Saint Augustine High School in San Diego, California.

References

External links
Just Sports Stats

Living people
1955 births
Players of American football from Cleveland
American football defensive ends
Virginia Cavaliers football players
Baltimore Colts players
Schoolteachers from California